Klopstock  is a German surname. Notable people with the surname include:

 Friedrich Gottlieb Klopstock (1724–1803), German poet
 Margareta "Meta" Klopstock, born Moller (1728–1758), a German writer, wife of Friedrich Gottlieb

German-language surnames
de:Klopstock